Tirwa is a constituency of the Uttar Pradesh Legislative Assembly covering the city of Tirwa in the Kannauj district of Uttar Pradesh, India.

Tirwa is one of five assembly constituencies in the Kannauj Lok Sabha constituency. Since 2008, this assembly constituency is numbered 197 amongst 403 constituencies.

Currently this seat belongs to Bharatiya Janta Party candidate Kailash Singh Rajput who won in last Assembly election of 2022 Uttar Pradesh Legislative Elections defeating Samajwadi Party candidate Anil Kumar Pal by a margin of 4608 votes.

2022

References

External links
 

Assembly constituencies of Uttar Pradesh
Kannauj district